Amale Andraos (born 1973) is a New York-based designer. She was dean of the Columbia Graduate School of Architecture, Planning and Preservation (2014-2021) and serves as advisor to the Columbia Climate School. She is the co-founder of the New York City architecture firm WORKac with her husband, Dan Wood. Her impact on architectural practice around the world was recognized when she was named Honorary Fellow of the Royal Architectural Institute of Canada in 2021.

Early years
Andraos was born in Beirut, Lebanon, and has lived in Saudi Arabia, France, Canada and the Netherlands. She holds a B. Arch from McGill University in Montreal and a Master of Architecture from the Harvard Graduate School of Design.

Work
Andraos has taught at Princeton University School of Architecture, Harvard Graduate School of Design, the University of Pennsylvania School of Design and the American University in Beirut. In 2014, she was named dean of the Columbia Graduate School of Architecture, Planning and Preservation. She was the first woman to hold that position. Her publications include We Will Get There When We Cross That Bridge (Monacelli Press, 2017), The Arab City: Architecture and Representation (Columbia Books on Architecture and the city, 2016), 49 Cities (Inventory Press, 3rd edition, 2015), and Above the Pavement, the Farm! (Princeton Architectural Press, 2010).

Andraos was named one of the "25 Most Admired Educators for 2016" by DesignIntelligence, which describes her as integrating "real world problems into the curriculum with a bold vision and strong leadership."

Andraos founded WORKac with her husband Dan Wood in 2003. The practice is based in New York City, with projects in the U.S. and abroad. The practice has achieved international recognition for projects such as Public Farm 1 for MoMA PS1 Young Architects Program, the Edible Schoolyards at PS216 in Brooklyn and PS7 in Harlem, NY, the new office headquarters for Wieden+Kennedy, also in New York, a residential conversion of a historic New York cast-iron building titled the Stealth Building, the Miami Museum Garage, and the Rhode Island School of Design Student Center in Providence. Andraos describes her firms work as an "intersection of the urban, the rural, and the natural."

Before co-founding WORKac, Andraos held positions at Rem Koolhaas/OMA in Rotterdam and New York, Saucier + Perrotte in Montreal and Atelier Big City also in Montreal.

As of October 2015, Andraos serves as a board member for the Architectural League of New York and the AUB Faculty of Engineering and Architecture International Advisory Committee. She is also on the New Museum’s New INC. Advisory Council.

Awards and honors

2021

 AIA New York Archicture Merit Award – Rhode Island School of Design Student Center

2020

 ArchMarathon Awards, Honoree – Rhode Island School of Design Student Center

2019

 AN Interior Top 50 Award, The Architects’ Newspaper
 Finalist Technical Innovation Award, Parking Today Awards – Miami Museum Garage 
 International Architecture Award, Parking & Transportation Center, The Chicago Athenaeum Museum of Architecture & Design – Miami Museum Garage 
 2019 Beazley Designs of the Year Award Nominee, The Design Museum in London – Miami Museum Garage 
 2019 Architizer A+Awards Jury Winner, Concepts - Plus - Architecture + Collaboration – Miami Museum Garage

2018

 Innovative Facility of the Year. NPA Innovation Award, National Parking Association - Miami Museum Garage
 Best Big Scale of the Year, AIA Miami Chapter, American Institute of Architects – Miami Museum Garage 
 Honorable Mention, Best of Design Award, The Architect's Newspaper
 Parking Structure Design Awards of Excellence, Florida Parking & Transportation Association – Miami Museum Garage
 GarageMASterworks Award, Best New Urban Amenity, Municipal Arts Society – Kew Gardens Hills Library
 AIA NY Architecture Merit Award - Kew Gardens Hills Library

2017

 #1 Design Firm, Architect 50, Architect Magazine
 Game Changers 2017, Metropolis Magazine 
 ArchDaily Building of the Year – Stealth Building
 AIA NY Architecture Merit Award – Stealth Building

2016

 New Generation Leader, Architectural Record Women in Architecture Award
"From A to Zaha: 26 Women Who Changed Architecture," Architizer

2015
 AIA New York State Firm of the Year
 Arch Daily 2015 Building of the Year – Wieden+Kennedy Offices
 AIA New York State Honor Award for Urban Design – Beijing Horticultural Expo Masterplan
 Award for Excellence in Design – New York City Public Design Commission – Issue Project Room

2014
 Interior Design Best Of Year Award – Wieden+Kennedy Offices
 AIA New York State Design Citation – Edible Schoolyard at P.S. 216
 MASterworks Award – Best Green Design Initiative, Municipal Arts Society – Edible Schoolyard at P.S. 216
 AIA NY Merit Interior Architecture Award – Wieden+Kennedy Offices

2013
 AIA NY Merit Interior Architecture Award – Children's Museum of the Arts
 AIA NY Merit Award for Urban Design – New Holland Island
 AIA Houston Merit Award for Renovation – Blaffer Art Museum
 City of Houston "Best Of" Awards: Best College Campus Building, and Best Artistic Renovation – Blaffer Art Museum

2010
 Award for Excellence in Design – New York City Public Design Commission

2009
 National Design Award Finalist – Interiors – Cooper Hewitt Design Museum
 Engineering Excellence Diamond Award – Structural Systems – ACEC New York
 AIA NY State Merit Award for Architecture – Public Farm 1

2008
 Best of the Best Awards, McGraw Hill Construction
 Structural Engineering Merit Award – Public Farm 1 – SEAoNY
 Year in Architecture, Top Ten Designs –  New York Magazine – Public Farm 1
 Project of the Year: Park/Landscape, National – New York Construction/ENR
 Best Landscape/Urban Design Project, Regional – New York Construction
 Best of Year Award, Interior Design Magazine
 AIA NY Chapter Merit Interior Architecture Award – Anthropologie Dos Lagos
 Emerging Voices – Architectural League of New York
 MASterwork Award – Best Historic Renovation, Municipal Arts Society – Diane von Furstenberg Studio HQ
 Young Architects Program – MoMA PS1 Contemporary Art Center

2007
 "New York Designs" – Architectural League

2006
 AIA NY Chapter Merit Interior Architecture Award – Lee Angel Showroom
 Design Vanguard – Architectural Record
 New Practices, New York – AIA NY and The Architects' Newspaper

Selected writing
 2019: “Problematizing the Regional Context: Representation in the Arab and Gulf Cities,” in The New Arab Urban: Gulf Cities of Wealth, Ambition, and Distress
2018: “The Timeliness of Architecture’s Eco-Visionary Practices,” in Eco-Visionaries: Art, Architecture, and New Media after the Anthropocene
2017: “Embodied Energy: Then and Now,” in Embodied Energy and Design 
2016: "The Arab City: Architecture and Representation", Columbia Books on Architecture and the City
 2015: "Beyond Bigness: Re-Reading the Peutinger Map," The Avery Review, Issue 01
 2014: "Strategies of the Void," Perspecta 48: Amnesia
 2013: "Visionary Urbanism and its Agency," Zawia, Issue 1: Utopia
 2012: "Futura Bold," Another Pamphlet Issue 3: The Future!
 2010: "Interviews," Praxis Journal: Issue 11&12: 11 architects 12 conversations
 2009: "Public Farm 1," Design Ecologies (Princeton Architectural Press)
 2008: "Depave the Parking Lot and Put Back Paradise," Architecture Magazine
 2007: "Will the Real Dubai Please Stand Up?" Superlative City: Dubai and the Urban Condition in the Early Twenty-First Century; "Cadavre Exquis Lebanese" in Visionary Power: Producing the Contemporary City; "Dubai's Island Urbanism" in Cities from Zero
 2006: "A Program Primer," Praxis Journal 8: reProgramming.
 2005: "Why are we still learning from Las Vegas?" in Bidoun, Issue 04, Dubai

References

Bibliography
We'll Get There When We Cross That Bridge (2017), The Monacelli Press, 
Architecture and Representation: the Arab City (2016), Columbia GSAPP Books on Architecture, 
 Above the Pavement, the Farm! Architecture and Agriculture at PF1 (2010), Princeton Architectural Press, 
 49 Cities (2009), Storefront for Art and Architecture , 3rd edition: Inventory Press (2015)

External links
 

Living people
Year of birth missing (living people)
American women architects
Lebanese architects
Columbia Graduate School of Architecture, Planning and Preservation faculty
Harvard Graduate School of Design alumni
McGill School of Architecture alumni
21st-century American architects
Artists from Beirut
Architects from New York City
21st-century American women
1973 births